In mathematics and physics, especially the study of mechanics and fluid dynamics, the d'Alembert-Euler condition is a requirement that the streaklines of a flow are irrotational.  Let x = x(X,t) be the coordinates of the point x into which X is carried at time t by a (fluid) flow.  Let  be the second material derivative of x.  Then the d'Alembert-Euler condition is:

The d'Alembert-Euler condition is named for Jean le Rond d'Alembert and Leonhard Euler who independently first described its use in the mid-18th century.  It is not to be confused with the Cauchy–Riemann conditions.

References

  See sections 45–48.
d'Alembert–Euler conditions on the Springer Encyclopedia of Mathematics

Fluid mechanics
Mechanical engineering
Vector calculus